A window treatment is a cover or modification of a window, often with the aim of enhancing the aesthetics of the window and the room.

Such treatments include:
 Hard treatments – these are made of hard materials such as wood, vinyl or aluminum. A more in depth description of the different types of hard treatments can be found below:
Window shutters; are usually installed into the window frame and consist of louvers, made either of wood or a poly resin that can either be stationary or tilt. They do not move up and down like blinds but in certain applications can fold across the window. Types of shutters include:
 Wood shutters
 Poly resin shutters
 Window blinds; have louvers which allow the user to open to a view without lifting the shade. It allows one to manipulate the light to create a customized feel. The name blinds comes from their use in blocking people from seeing into a home; they essentially "blind the observer's view". Over time, many new options and designs have developed, including anti-dust features and fabric tapes for blinds. 
 Types of blinds include:
 Natural Wood blinds
 Faux Wood blinds (also known as Plaswood)
 1" Vinyl Mini blinds
 2" Vinyl Mini blinds
 Vinyl/Fabric Vertical blinds
 Aluminum blinds
 Window shades; are a piece of fabric which rolls, stacks or folds, opening to a view only when the shade is rolled up. That was the classic definition, now certain shades do allow for "view through". 
 Types of shades include:
 Roman shades
 Roller shades
 Solar shades
 Cellular shades
 Pleated shades
 Sheer shades
 Soft treatments are anything made of soft materials, such as:
Curtains
 Drapery

Treatments around the window include:
 Molding (decorative)
 Cornice board or pelmet
 Window valance

Treatments applied directly to the glass include:
 Frosted glass
 Smart glass
 Stained glass

Modern professional window treatments offer options for mobilized systems or systems which are designed for children safety.

Notes

Interior design